The Esil University, also referred simply as KazUEFIT, is a private university in Astana, Kazakhstan.

The university was established in 1999 in Almaty. In 2006, the university was relocated to Astana to be a branch office of the Turar Ryskulov Kazakh Economic University in order to develop a new educational and cultural center in Astana. In 2007 after the changes in legislation regarding the educational sphere the branch office has seized the activity and was transformed into an independent higher educational institution – Kazakh University of Economics, Finance and International Trade.

Affiliations
Kazakh University of Economics, Finance and International Trade is member of the European Association of Institutions in Higher Education (EURASHE), and the European Retail Academy (ERA).

Partners 
EU Business School
SolBridge International School of Business
Moscow State University of Economics, Statistics, and Informatics
Hotel and Tourism Management Institute Switzerland
University of California, Riverside

References

External links 
 

1999 establishments in Kazakhstan
Educational institutions established in 1999
Universities in Kazakhstan
Universities in Astana